Saint-Just-en-Chaussée is a railway station serving the town Saint-Just-en-Chaussée, Oise department, northern France. It is situated on the Paris–Lille railway.

The station is served by regional trains to Paris, Creil and Amiens.

References

Railway stations in Oise
Railway stations in France opened in 1846